The Metropolitan Transportation Authority (MTA) operates a number of bus routes in the Bronx, New York, United States. Many of them are the direct descendants of streetcar lines (see list of streetcar lines in the Bronx). All local buses are operated by the New York City Transit Authority, except for the Bx23, which is operated by the MTA Bus Company.

Eight Metro-North Railroad feeder routes are operated by Logan Bus Company to and from the Riverdale and Spuyten Duyvil stations, under contract with the brand name of Hudson Rail Link. See Hudson Rail Link for more details.

List of routes
This table gives details for the routes prefixed with "Bx" - in other words, those considered to run primarily in the Bronx by the MTA. For details on routes with other prefixes, see the following articles:

List of bus routes in Manhattan: M125
List of bus routes in Queens: Q44 Select Bus Service, Q50, Q100 (on Rikers Island)
List of express bus routes in New York City: BxM1, BxM2, BxM3, BxM4, BxM6, BxM7, BxM8, BxM9, BxM10, BxM11, BxM18
List of bus routes in Westchester County: Bee-Line 1, 2, 3, 4, 20, 21, 25, 26, 40, 41, 42, 43, 45, 52, 54, 55, 60, 61, 62.

All routes are operated under New York City Bus except for the Bx23, which is operated under MTA Bus. Routes marked with an asterisk (*) run 24 hours a day. Connections to New York City Subway stations at the bus routes' terminals are also listed where applicable.

MTA Regional Bus Operations

Hudson Rail Link
See Hudson Rail Link

History of current routes

2020s redesign 
As part of the MTA's 2017 Fast Forward Plan to speed up mass transit service, a draft plan for a reorganization of Bronx bus routes was proposed in draft format in June 2019, with a final version published in October 2019. Many of the draft proposals were not included in the final version. These changes were set to take effect in mid-2020. Due to the COVID-19 pandemic, the implementation of the bus redesign was postponed by two years. The Bx28 and Bx34 routes were originally proposed to be modified as well, but those changes were reverted in late 2021. The redesign took effect on June 26, 2022.

Former routes

July 1974 renumbered prefixed routes
On July 1, 1974, a few routes were combined with then-existing routes or eliminated, and most prefixed routes were renumbered:

February 1984 Bronx bus route revamp
On February 19, 1984, the entire Bronx bus system was revamped, with several routes renumbered, merged or eliminated, although a few retained their original numbers (not listed below). 15 routes were renumbered, but kept intact, and four new routes were created. Prior to the change, buses displayed signs showing both old and new numbers to simplify the change. The changes were as follows:

Discontinued services

References
MTA NYC Transit - Bus Service

External links

Bus transportation in New York City
Transportation in the Bronx
Bronx
 
Bronx
Bronx-related lists